The Kamloops Indian Residential School was part of the Canadian Indian residential school system. Located in Kamloops, British Columbia, it was once the largest residential school in Canada, with its enrolment peaking at 500 in the 1950s. The school was established in 1890 and remained in operation until 1969, when it was taken over by the federal government from the Catholic Church to be used as a day school residence. It closed in 1978. The school building still stands today, and is located on the Tk’emlúps te Secwépemc First Nation.

In the early 2000s, a tourist discovered a juvenile rib in the area, and in the late 1990s a child's tooth was found. In 2021, Sarah Beaulieu—an anthropologist at the University of the Fraser Valley—surveyed the area with ground-penetrating radar and concluded the probable presence of about 200 unmarked graves, though "only forensic investigation with excavation" could confirm if these were actually human remains. As of May 2022, debates were ongoing on whether to conduct an archaeological excavation to exhume potential human remains or leave the site undisturbed.

History 
What would become the Kamloops Indian Residential School was established in 1893, after initially opening on May 19, 1890, as the Kamloops Industrial School. The stated aim of the school was the acculturation of Indigenous children. J.D. Ross of Kamloops was awarded the $10,000 contract to erect the initial set of industrial school buildings in April 1889. Three two-story wooden structures were the first buildings on the site, consisting of separate living quarters for boys and girls, and the school's teachers, along with classrooms and a recreation area.

Michel Hagan, the industrial school's first principal, resigned in 1892, at which time the government charged the Oblates of Mary Immaculate with running the school. Father Alphonse-Marie Carion was named principal of the school in March 1893, following Hagan's departure. In his 1896 annual report to the Department of Indian Affairs, Carion emphasized that the moral and religious training of students at the school was "the most important of all" and that school officials kept "constantly before their mind the object which the Government has in view in carrying on the industrial-schools, which is to civilize the Indians, to make them good, useful and lawabiding members of society." He remained principal of the school until 1916.

In 1927, John Duplanil succeeded James Mcguire as principal of the school, following Maguire's appointment as curate of St. Patrick's Church in Lethbridge, Alberta. James Fergus O'Grady was named principal in 1939, following the departure of T. Kennedy. G.P. Dunlop took over as head of the school in 1958, relocating from a position at the Eugene Mission Indian School in Cranbrook, British Columbia.

The school, located on the traditional territory of the Secwepemc (Secwépemcúl'ecw), continued as the Kamloops Indian Residential School until 1978. The school was taken over by the federal government in 1969. During this time it operated as a residence for students attending other area schools until it permanently closed.

The school was featured in the 1962 Christmas-themed film Eyes of the Children. Produced by George Robertson, the film followed 400 students as they prepared for Christmas and aired on the CBC on Christmas Day. Gerald Mathieu Moran worked there while the documentary was filmed. A boy's supervisor, he was charged in the 1990s with several dozen sex crimes committed at the Kamloops Indian Residential School. He pled guilty and spent three years in jail. A former student told a TRC hearing that another instructor would come into the girls' dorm at night with a flashlight and choose a girl to assault.

In the 1988 book Resistance and renewal: surviving the Indian residential school, Celia Haig-Brown argued that the school system had failed due to the resistance of the Shuswap (Secwepemc) people, since they still existed as a nation:  In 1991, a special edition of Secwepemc News offered a different perspective, reporting that the public policy which led to the 80-year operation of the school had "done its job; English is now the predominant language within the Shuswap Nation and the survival of the Shuswap language is uncertain."

The building was the first location of the Secwepemc Museum, which opened in 1982.

School attendance and conditions 

Hundreds of children attended the school, many forcibly removed from their homes following the introduction of mandatory attendance laws in the 1920s. The children who attended were not allowed to speak their native language and were whipped for using it. In addition to Secwépemc children, students from communities across British Columbia attended the school, including Penticton, Hope, Mount Currie, and Lillooet, along with students from other provinces.

At one point, it was the largest Canadian residential school. Canadian politician Leonard Marchand, a member of the Okanagan Indian Band, attended the school. So did George Manuel of the Secwépemc Nation, who said his three strongest memories of the school were: "hunger; speaking English; and being called a heathen because of my grandfather."

In 1910, the principal said that the government did not provide enough money to properly feed the students. On December 24, 1924, the girls' wing of the school was destroyed by a fire, forcing 40 students into  weather in only their night clothes. Three years later, in 1927, a report outlining the conditions at the school concluded that the poor construction of buildings at the school led to "numerous infections, colds, bronchitis, and pneumonia" during the previous winter. During the 1957–1958 influenza pandemic, the Kamloops district health officer, D. M. Black, reported that half of the students at the school had been ill. At the time, health officials from the University of British Columbia acknowledged the infection rate was "slightly more than normal but not a serious worry."

In 2015, the Truth and Reconciliation Commission of Canada determined that the residential schools were a system of "cultural genocide". It concluded that at least 4,100 students died while attending the schools, many of them due to abuse, negligence, disease, and accidents. The report concluded that it would be impossible to estimate the total number of deaths that occurred at the schools. 

Students at the school received harsh treatment, including being hit with a shillelagh or being shamed for minor mistakes.

Mandatory European folk dancing 
The school operated a girls' folk dancing program beginning in the 1940s that focused on European dance styles only. Sister Mary Leonita initially taught Irish dancing, and later, other European folk styles including Swiss and Ukrainian dancing. Children in the program were prohibited from learning indigenous dances.

Dancers from the program were featured at the 1960 Pacific National Exhibition. In July 1964, girls from the school went to Mexico and performed in a series of festivals. Canadian embassy officials called them the "finest ambassadors ever to come from Canada". The Knights of Columbus raised the funds for the trip. The same year, group leader Sister Mary Leonita transferred away from the school, and the dance program ended.

Possible unmarked graves
In 2021, Dr. Sarah Beaulieu, an anthropologist with "about a decade of experience searching for historical grave sites", surveyed the area with ground-penetrating radar and observed "disruptions in the ground" which she concluded could be 200 unmarked graves, based on "their placement, size, depth, and other features".  The indigenous community had long suspected that unmarked graves were located at the residential school, but no proof existed to support this. Kukpi7 (Chief) Rosanne Casimir of Tk’emlúps te Secwépemc (TteS) said that work was underway to determine whether the Royal British Columbia Museum held relevant records. Preliminary findings announced in May 2021 by Tk’emlúps te Secwépemc speculated that 215 graves could exist at the site. The National Centre for Truth and Reconciliation had officially recognized 51 students who died at the school. Their dates of death range from 1919 until 1971. In July 2021, Beaulieu revised her estimate to 200 and noted that they should be considered "probable burials" or "targets of interest" because only with an excavation could they be confirmed as human remains. Beaulieu also noted that the apple orchard she surveyed constituted only two acres of the 160-acre residential school site, and speculated that other parts of the property could be potential burial sites. 

The Regional Chief of the British Columbia Assembly of First Nations, Terry Teegee, speculated that human remains were at the site, and said in May 2021 that plans were being made for forensic experts to exhume, identify and repatriate the remains of the children from the school. A May 2021 press release issued by TteS erroneously reported "the confirmation of the remains of 215 children who were students of the Kamloops Indian Residential School".

A year after the announcement, no attempted exhumations had taken place yet. In May 2022, Casimir said that a technical task force had been formed "of various professors as well as technical archeologists" and that work on an archeological dig and possible exhumations could soon begin, although CBC reported that the idea remained controversial among school survivors, "with some seeing exhumation as a process that could help lay victims properly to rest, while others want them left undisturbed." The RCMP "E" Division stated at the time that while it had opened an investigation "so that we can assist should our assistance be required", it was "respect[ing] that Tk'emlúps te Secwépemc remains as the lead official at this time", and was not looking into the site itself.

As of May 2022, no remains had been excavated, leaving the initial claim unverified.

Reactions 
Reactions generally took for granted that the discovery had been substantiated, but this remains to be verified.

Kukpi7 Chief Rosanne Casimir called the finding "an unthinkable loss ... never documented by the school's administrators". 

A statement released by First Nations Health Authority CEO Richard Jock expressed sadness. 
Premier of British Columbia John Horgan said that he was "horrified and heartbroken" at the discovery, and that he supported further efforts to bring to "light the full extent of this loss". Federal Minister of Indigenous Services Marc Miller also offered his support. Prime Minister Justin Trudeau called the discovery "heartbreaking" the day of the announcement, and, on May 30, advised the Governor General to order flags on federal buildings to be flown at half-mast until further notice. Some institutions flew the Canadian flag at half-mast for 215 hours, to mark 1 hour for each child. Other half-mastings included flags at the BC and Manitoba legislatures as well as individual municipalities such as Ottawa, Montreal, Edmonton, Mississauga, Brampton, and Toronto, which also ordered the 3D Toronto sign dimmed for 215 hours.

In a statement released May 31, 2021, the Office of the Chief of Tk’emlúps te Secwépemc acknowledged the gestures made by the government and federal parties, but insisted the government face accountability to all communities subjected to the enduring effects of the federally-mandated Indian Residential School system.

Angela White, executive director for the Indian Residential School Survivors Society, also called on the Canadian federal government and Catholic Church to take action and responsibility towards reconciliation efforts, stating "Reconciliation does not mean anything if there is no action to those words... [w]ell-wishes and prayers only go so far. If we are going to actually create positive strides forward there needs to be that ability to continue the work, like the Indian Residential School Survivors Society does, in a meaningful way."

The discovery inspired a community memorial at the Vancouver Art Gallery, at which 215 pairs of children's shoes were laid out in rows. Similar memorials were created across Canada, including in front of government buildings and church buildings that had been in charge of running the residential school system. At the Ontario Legislative Building, security initially ordered the shoes removed before acquiescing. The Anishinabek Nation tweeted in support of social media calls to put out teddy bears on porches on May 31, similar to what was done after the 2018 Humboldt Broncos bus crash with hockey sticks. Another popular campaign called on people to wear orange on May 31.

Within days of the report, the University of British Columbia announced a review of an honorary degree it had granted in 1986 to James Fergus O'Grady, a former Kamloops Indian Residential School principal. He authored a letter to parents in 1948 about the "privilege" of Christmas break, stating that any travel costs associated with students going home would have to be covered by their families and that any children who failed to return to school by January 3 would be prohibited from Christmas break the following year. In the 2007 documentary The Fallen Feather, Ernie Philip shared his experience of corporal punishment as a student at the school, stating that he "got 50 lashes on my back" from O'Grady after Philip was caught running away from the school.

On June 2, 2021, Archbishop of Vancouver J. Michael Miller said that the Catholic Church would help to identify the deceased children.

Alberta premier Jason Kenney, leader of the United Conservative Party, argued in a June 3 op-ed on the front page of the National Post that "If we want to get into cancelling every figure in our history who took positions on issues at the time that we now judge harshly, and rightly, in historical retrospect, then I think the entire founding leadership of our country gets cancelled."

On June 4, 2021, nine United Nations human rights experts called on Canada and the Catholic Church to carry out thorough investigations, and "conduct full-fledged investigations into the circumstances and responsibilities surrounding these deaths, including forensic examinations of the remains found, and to proceed to the identification and registration of the missing children." On June 6, 2021, speaking to people gathered in St. Peter's Square, Pope Francis commented on the discovery:

In response to the discovery, the Government of Ontario pledged $10 million to fund a search for unmarked graves at Ontario residential schools. Many Canada Day festivities were either cancelled or modified to promote reconciliation, out of respect for the discovery. On June 10, the city of Victoria, British Columbia announced the cancellation of its Canada Day festivities – already a virtual event due to COVID-19 restrictions. An alternative broadcast would be produced in collaboration with the local First Nations to "[explore] what it means to be Canadian, in light of recent events." Similar decisions to cancel municipality-led Canada Day festivities were made by Prince Edward County, Ontario, Air Ronge, La Ronge, and Lac La Ronge Indian Band. According to a poll released on June 17, 2021, by the Innovative Research Group, 77% of Canadian respondents said they were "very familiar" or "somewhat familiar" with the reports of possible human remains of Kamloops Indian Residential School.

On June 22, 2021, the Chinese government demanded an investigation into the human rights violations against the Indigenous people in Canada at the UN Human Rights Council, which was supported by Belarus, Iran, North Korea, Syria, Russia and Venezuela. Canadian Prime Minister Justin Trudeau responded that, "In Canada, we had a Truth and Reconciliation Commission. Where's China's Truth and Reconciliation Commission? China is not recognizing there is even a problem. That is a pretty fundamental difference."

See also 
 List of Indian residential schools in Canada
 2021 Canadian Indian residential schools gravesite discoveries
Florida School for Boys, school where dozens of children were found in unmarked graves
Bon Secours Mother and Baby Home, maternity home in Ireland where 800 children were found in unmarked graves
Medomsley Detention Centre, a prison for young males in England where over 1,800 living former inmates reported sexual and physical abuse by staff.
 Marieval Indian Residential School, another Residential School in Canada where 751 unmarked graves were found in June 2021

Notes

References

Further reading

External links 
 Kamloops Indian Residential School—The Land of the Secwepemc website
Eyes of the Children – 1962 CBC documentary about the school

Residential schools in British Columbia
1893 establishments in British Columbia
1977 disestablishments in British Columbia
Buildings and structures in Kamloops
Defunct schools in Canada
First Nations history in British Columbia
Education in Kamloops
Educational institutions established in 1893
Educational institutions disestablished in 1977
Schools in British Columbia
Secwepemc
Controversies in Canada
2021 controversies